The Monroe metropolitan area may refer to:

The Monroe, Louisiana metropolitan area, United States
The Monroe, Michigan metropolitan area, United States

See also
Monroe (disambiguation)